Atlético de San Luis Femenil is a Mexican professional women's football club based in San Luis Potosí that competes in the Liga MX Femenil. The club has been the women's section of Atlético San Luis since 2019.

The team was founded for 2019–20 Liga MX Femenil season, after the promotion of the men's section to Liga MX, because the division requires participating teams to have a Women's squad to be part of the competition.

Personnel

Management

Coaching staff

Players

Current squad

Out on loan

References

Sport in San Luis Potosí City
Football clubs in San Luis Potosí
Association football clubs established in 2019
2019 establishments in Mexico
Women's association football clubs in Mexico